Kuba & Pilař Architects is a Czech architecture firm based in Brno and established in 1998 by Ladislav Kuba and Tomáš Pilař.

Founders 

Kuba was born on 26 July 1964 in Brno. He studied at the Faculty of Architecture at the Brno University of Technology (VUT) from 1982 to 1986 and the Academy of Arts in Prague from 1986 to 1990.

Tomáš Pilař was born on 11 October 1963 in Brno. He studied at the Faculty of Civil Engineering at VUT from 1982 to 1987 and the Academy of Arts, Architecture and Design in Prague from 1987 to 1994.

Professional activities 
Kuba & Pilař Architects was established in 1998. Kuba worked from 2001 to 2002 as guest lecturer at the Faculty of Architecture at VUT. Pilař also worked there in the years 1994 and 1998-2000. From 2011 to 2012 he was a guest lecturer at the Faculty of Architecture at the Technical University of Liberec. They have given lectures for students and professionals in the Czech Republic, Austria, and Germany.

Exhibitions 
 Mega will be Giga – Vienna 2004
 Wonderland Tour – Prague, Berlin, Paris, Amsterdam and some other European cities 2004–2007
 Brick 10 – Vienna 2010
 New Face of Prague – Prague 2010, and some other European cities
 V4 architecture – Prague 2011
 KILL YOUR IDOL (Zabij svého Fuchse) - Psychoanalysis of Contemporary Architecture of the City of Brno - 4AM Brno 2011
 Czech and Slovak pavillon at the 13th International Architecture Exhibition of la Biennale di Venezia 2012 
 Kunstverein Leipzig 2013

Works 

 Chapel Panny Marie - Královny, Jestřebí, 1998
 Apartment villas in Neumannova street, Brno, 2001
 Faculty of Arts, Library, Masaryk University, Brno, 2001
 Department store Omega, Brno, 2006
 Fountain, Svobody square, Brno, 2006
 Chapel sv. Antonína, Černá, 2006
 Residential estate Na Krutci, Prague, 2008
 Scientific Library, Ostrava, project 2008
 Citypark department center, Jihlava, 2008
 Faculty of Chemistry and Technology, University Pardubice, 2008
 Gymnasium, University Pardubice, 2008
 Apartment house, Ostrava, 2010
 Office building, Ostrava, 2011
 Gallery of West Bohemia, Plzeň, project 2012
 Faculty of Humanities, Charles Univerzity in Prague, project 2013

Awards 

 2002 – Main Price Grand Prix OA for Faculty of Arts, Library, Masaryk Univerzity
 2002 – Grand Prix OA in category housing for Apartment villas in Neumannova street, Brno
 2003 – nomination of Czech republic for Mies van der Rohe Award, Faculty of Arts, Library, Masaryk univerzity
 2007 - nomination of Czech republic for Mies van der Rohe Award, Chapel sv.Antonína, Ćerná
 2007 - nomination of Czech republic for Mies van der Rohe Award, Department store Omega, Brno
 2007 – Main Price Best of Realty for Residential estate Na Krutci, Prague
 2009 – Main Price Grand Prix OA for Faculty of Chemistry and Technology, University Pardubice
 2009 – Building of the Year for Citypark department center, Jihlava
 2009 – Main Price Best of Realty for Citypark department center, Jihlava
 2009 - nomination of Czech republic for Mies van der Rohe Award, Residential estate Na Krutci, Prague
 2010 – finalist Brick Award 2010, Residential estate Na Krutci, Prague
 2011 - nomination of Czech republic for Mies van der Rohe Award, Faculty of Chemistry and Technology, University Pardubice
 2011 - Grand Prix OA in category new building for Apartment house, Ostrava

References

External links 
 www.arch.cz/kuba.pilar/

Architecture firms of the Czech Republic
Brno
Design companies established in 1998
Czech companies established in 1998